Lavell Crawford (born November 11, 1968) is an American comedian and actor. He is best known for playing Huell Babineaux in Breaking Bad (2011–2013) and its spin-off Better Call Saul (2017–2022). He also played the role of Gus Patch in the Netflix original movie The Ridiculous 6 (2015). The album version of his 2021 Comedy Vaccine special was nominated for the Grammy Award for Best Comedy Album at the 64th Annual Grammy Awards.

Early life 
Crawford grew up in St. Louis County, Missouri, eventually settling in Pagedale. He has two sisters, Elonda and Erica. He struggled with his weight in childhood and experienced a near-drowning at age ten. Crawford graduated from Pattonville High School in 1986 before attending Missouri Western State College, where he studied computer science.

Career 

Crawford began performing standup comedy professionally in 1990. He frequently performed on BET's ComicView during the 1990s. He was a contestant on NBC's Last Comic Standing in 2007, where in the two-hour season finale he lost to Jon Reep. In 2011 at the Roberts Orpheum Theatre in St. Louis, he recorded Lavell Crawford: Can a Brother Get Some Love.

Crawford portrayed Saul Goodman's laconic bodyguard Huell Babineaux in the crime drama series Breaking Bad and its spinoff, Better Call Saul, from 2011 to 2022. He also played Babineaux in 
Huell's Rules, a comedy short set after the events of Breaking Bad. Crawford has also appeared in comedic roles in It's Always Sunny in Philadelphia, Tosh.0, The Nightly Show with Larry Wilmore, and Aqua TV Show Show.

Personal life

Filmography

Film

Television

References

External links 

Living people
20th-century American comedians
21st-century American comedians
20th-century American male actors
21st-century American male actors
African-American male comedians
American male comedians
American male film actors
Last Comic Standing contestants
African-American male actors
American male television actors
American male voice actors
20th-century African-American people
21st-century African-American people
1968 births